Memory League is a memory competition platform originally founded and created by Nelson Dellis and Simon Orton under the name Extreme Memory Tournament (XMT).

Memory League differs from traditional memory competitions in the fact that it is entirely digital, has head-to-head matches, and is composed of shorter disciplines. The five disciplines are one-minute memorization of names, words, images, numbers, and cards.

The first three world championships took place in San Diego, California in 2014, 2015, and 2016. The structure of the competition saw 24 of the World's top memorizers, including Alex Mullen (USA), Johannes Mallow (Germany), Simon Reinhard, Boris Konrad (Germany), Andi Bell (UK), Ben Pridmore (UK), Jonas von Essen (Sweden), and Yanjaa compete for up to USD $75,000 in prize money per championship over the course of three days. The fourth world championship was held online in January 2022.

2014 World Championship 

The 2014 World Championship took place on April 26–27.

2014 Winners 

The 2014 winners of the World Championship were:

 First place: Simon Reinhard
 Second place: Johannes Mallow
 Third place: Jonas von Essen

2015 World Championship 

Mnemonists from seven countries competed in over 45 rounds on May 2–3, 2016. The competition was won by Johannes Mallow.

2015 Winners 

The 2015 winners of the World Championship were:

 First place: Johannes Mallow
 Second place: Boris Konrad
 Third place: Simon Reinhard

2016 World Championship 

The 2016 world championship took place on June 24–26 and was an IAM-ranked competition.

2016 Winners 

The 2016 winners of the world championship were:

 First place: Simon Reinhard
 Second place: Purevjav Erdenesaikhan
 Third place: Tsetsegzul Zorigtbaatar

2022 World Championship 

The 2022 World Championship was held online from January 16-31 as the culmination of the 2021 World Tour, which consisted of three seasons and three slam tournaments, with the top 16 competitors qualifying for the World Championship.

2022 Winners 

The 2022 winners of the world championship were:

 First place: Alex Mullen
 Second place: Andrea Muzii
 Third place: Simon Reinhard

2023 World Championship 

The 2023 World Championship was held online from January 8-29 as the culmination of the 2022 World Tour, which consisted of three seasons and three slam tournaments, with the top 16 competitors qualifying for the World Championship.

2023 Winners 

The 2023 winners of the world championship were:

 First place: Alex Mullen
 Second place: Andrea Muzii
 Third place: Vishvaa Rajakumar

Online Memory League Championship 

There is a seasonal Online Memory League Championship, which in 2021 was incorporated into an annual "World Tour," consisting of three regular seasons interspersed with three slam tournaments.

Other Memory League Championships 

Other Memory League championships have included, among others:

 2019 Scandinavia Open Memory League Championship
 2018 Japan Memory League Championship
 2018 Egypt Kids Memory League Championship
 2018 Egypt Junior Memory League Championship
 2018 Scandinavian Open Memory League Championship
 2018 Canada Junior Memory League Championship
 2017 Scandinavian Open Memory League Championship
 2017 German Open Memory League Championship
 2017 UK Open Memory League Championship
 2016 UK Memory League Championship

See also 

 USA Memory Championship
 Grand Master of Memory
 List of world championships in mind sports
 Memory sport
 Method of loci
 Mnemonist
 Mnemonic major system

References 

Memory games
Memory
Recurring sporting events established in 2014
2014 establishments in California